The Tiraumea River is a river of the Tasman Region of New Zealand's South Island. The river has its source on the slopes of Mount Hutton at the southern end of the Braeburn Range, and runs northwest from the Tiraumea Saddle. It reaches the Tutaki River 10 kilometres southeast of Murchison. The area is known for hunting.

The Tiraumea Track runs the full length of the river, descending from the Tiraumea Saddle to Lake Rotoroa. A Department of Conservation back-country hut is located beside the river.

References

Rivers of the Tasman District
Rivers of New Zealand